Pounce may refer to:
Pounce (powder), a powder used to prevent ink from spreading and to blot up excess ink
 Pouncing, a method of transferring images from one surface to another
Pounce (cat treats), a brand of cat treats
Pounce (mascot), Georgia State University's blue panther mascot
Pounce, University of Wisconsin–Milwaukee's black panther mascot
FC Gold Pride's cougar mascot
Pounce (physics) or pop, in physics, the sixth derivative of the position vector with respect to time
Pounce (Transformers), a character from the Transformers series
The Pounce, A professional wrestling attack
Pounce (card game), the card game known as Nerts or Nertz in America
Pownce, a free social networking and micro-blogging site.